Namakkal is a Lok Sabha Constituency in Tamil Nadu, India. Its Tamil Nadu Parliamentary Constituency number is 16 of 39. It was a part of Rasipuram (Lok Sabha constituency) in previous parliament Election. Namakkal Lok Sabha Constituency consists of Sankagiri, Rasipuram, Senthamangalam, Namakkal, Paramathi-Velur and Tiruchengodu assembly segments. Out of these 6 assembly segments Rasipuram is Reserved for SC candidates and Senthamangalam assembly segment is reserved for ST Candidates.

History
Tiruchengode (Lok Sabha constituency) and Rasipuram (Lok Sabha constituency) were delimited in 2008 and the area became a part of the Namakkal (Lok Sabha constituency).

Assembly segments
Namakkal Lok Sabha constituency is composed of the following assembly segments:

Members of the Parliament

Election results

General Election 2019

General Election 2014

General Election 2009

Note: After 1967 Delimitation Order Namakkal Lok Sabha Constituency is abolished Upto 2008 Delimitation ,2009 Is the first election After Delimitation.

General Election 1962

References

External links
Namakkal lok sabha  constituency election 2019 date and schedule

Namakkal district
Lok Sabha constituencies in Tamil Nadu